The Garry McDonald Show is a 1977 Australian sketch show for television. It was shot in Gore Hill, Sydney for the ABC. John Eastway was the producer. It consisted of ten episodes.

Cast
 Garry McDonald
 Jude Kuring
 Ron Blanchard
 Ric Hutton

References

External links
The Garry McDonald Show at IMDb

1977 Australian television series debuts
1977 Australian television series endings
Australian television sketch shows